Champniers-et-Reilhac is a commune in the Dordogne department in Nouvelle-Aquitaine in southwestern France.

Population

See also
Communes of the Dordogne department

References

External links

Official site
Bed and Breakfast in Champniers-et-Reilhac

Communes of Dordogne